Marc Cohn is the debut studio album released in 1991 by American singer-songwriter Marc Cohn. The album peaked at No. 38 on the Billboard 200 Chart. It was RIAA certified gold in 1992 and was certified platinum in 1996. The album peaked at number 31 in Australia and was certified gold there in 1992.

The album is known for the hit single "Walking in Memphis". Following the release of the album, Cohn won the 1992 Grammy Award for Best New Artist.

Track listing
Track 9 written by Willie Dixon; all other tracks written by Marc Cohn.

Personnel 
Adapted from the album's liner notes.

 Marc Cohn – lead vocals, acoustic piano (1, 3-8, 11), electric piano (2), backing vocals (2, 3), organ (9), acoustic guitar (10)
 Chris Palmaro – Hammond organ (1)
 Eric Rehl – keyboards (1, 4, 11)
 John Leventhal – organ (1), guitars (1, 2, 4, 6, 8, 10), bass (1, 2, 4, 6), six-string bass (2, 4, 7), drum programming (2), shaker (2), bouzouki (6, 11), electric guitar (7), slide guitar (11)
 Kenny White – backing vocals (2, 3), keyboards (3), percussion (3, 11)
 Ben Wisch – keyboards (3, 5-8, 11)
 Stephen Tubin – accordion (3), harmonium (7)
 Robin Batteau – acoustic guitar (3), mandolin (3), violin (11)
 Bill Dillon – pedal steel guitar (3), guitar (5)
 David Spinozza – acoustic guitar (7)
 Mark Egan – bass (7, 10)
 Dennis McDermott – drums (1, 2)
 Steve Gadd – drums (7, 10)
 Jerry Marotta – drums (9), percussion (9)
 Bashiri Johnson – percussion (2, 7, 10)
 Don Alias – percussion (3), chimes (5)
 Arto Tuncboyaciyan – percussion (4), backing vocals (4)
 Glen Velez – Filipino buzz sticks (4), shaker (4), frame drum (4)
 Peter Gordon – French horn (3)
 Vivian Cherry – backing vocals (1)
 Dennis Collins – backing vocals (1)
 Ada Dyer – backing vocals (1)
 Darryl Tookes – backing vocals (1)
 Frank Floyd – backing vocals (2)
 Milt Grayson – backing vocals (2)
 Frank Simms – backing vocals (2)
 James Taylor – lead vocals (10)

Production 
 Arranged by Marc Cohn, John Leventhal and Kenny White.
 Produced by Marc Cohn and Ben Wisch
 Recorded, Engineered and Mixed by Ben Wisch
 Assistant Engineers – Dennis Cupit, Matt Knobel, Mike Krowiak, Donna Roth and Chris Theis.
 Digital Sequencing (Track 7) – Matt Knobel
 Mastered by Bob Ludwig at Masterdisk (New York, NY).
 Art Direction and Design – Roger Gorman at Reiner Design Consultants, Inc.
 Photography – Peter Liepke
 Project Coordinator – Kathy Rooney
 Management – Peregrine Watts-Russell

Charts

Certifications

Notes 

1991 debut albums
Marc Cohn albums
Atlantic Records albums